is a Japanese instructor of Shotokan karate.
 
He is currently an instructor of the Japan Karate Association.

Biography

Satoshi Takahashi was born in Osaka, Japan on 9 February 1968. He studied at Takushoku University. His karate training began during his 5th year of elementary school.

Competition
Satoshi Takahashi has had considerable success in karate competition.

Major Tournament Success
50th JKA All Japan Karate Championship (2007) - 3rd Place Kata
44th JKA All Japan Karate Championship (2001) - 3rd Place Kumite; 3rd Place Kata
42nd JKA All Japan Karate Championship (1999) - 3rd Place Kata
38th JKA All Japan Karate Championship (1995) - 3rd Place Kumite

References

 

1968 births
Japanese male karateka
Karate coaches
Shotokan practitioners
Sportspeople from Osaka Prefecture
Takushoku University alumni
Living people
20th-century Japanese people
21st-century Japanese people